Shaïda Zarumey (born Fatouma Agnès Diaroumèye, 1938) is a Nigerien sociologist and poet, one of the first in her country to write in French.

Born in Bamako to a Nigerien father and a Malian mother,  Diaroumèye spent the first ten years of her life in Niger, where she completed her primary studies.  She continued her education in Mali before obtaining a doctorate in Paris in 1970. A socioeconomist by training, she began working in Dakar at the Institut Africain de Développement Économique et de Planification of the United Nations, where she was employed from 1970 to 1975; she then became a functionary dedicated to women's rights.  She has traveled widely in support of her work. As a poet, under the pen name Shaïda Zarumey, she published Alternances pour le sultan in 1981.

References

1938 births
Living people
Nigerien poets
Nigerien women poets
20th-century poets
20th-century women writers
People from Bamako
Nigerien people of Malian descent
Nigerien officials of the United Nations
Pseudonymous women writers
20th-century pseudonymous writers